Angelo Morbelli (Alessandria, 1853 – Milan, 1919) was an Italian painter of the Divisionist style.

Biography
A grant from the City Council of Alessandria enabled Morbelli to enrol at the Brera Academy of Fine Arts, Milan, in 1867. He was awarded the Fumagalli Prize at the Brera exhibition of 1883 for Last Days (Milan, Galleria d’Arte Moderna) as well as a gold medal at the Paris Universal Exhibition of 1889. The work inaugurated a series of paintings on the Pio Albergo Trivulzio home for the aged, which was accompanied by others addressing social themes. He took part in the 1st Brera Triennale in 1891 with work of a Divisionist character. The Divisionist technique of separate colours was also employed in socially committed works subsequently shown at the exhibitions in Milan, Venice and Rome and the intense landscapes that followed them towards the second decade of the new century.

One of his pupils was Pietro Morando.

References

 Laura Casone, Angelo Morbelli, online catalogue Artgate by Fondazione Cariplo, 2010, CC BY-SA (source for the first revision of this article).

Other projects

19th-century Italian painters
Italian male painters
20th-century Italian painters
Painters from Milan
Divisionist painters
Brera Academy alumni
1853 births
1919 deaths
19th-century Italian male artists
20th-century Italian male artists